Courtney Bowman (born 1 February 1995) is an English stage actress and singer. She originated the role of Fatimah in Everybody's Talking About Jamie at the Crucible and Apollo Theatre. She played Anne Boleyn in Six at the Arts Theatre, Lyric Theatre and Vaudeville Theatre and Elle Woods in Legally Blonde at the Regent's Park Open Air Theatre. Bowman currently stars in Pretty Woman: The Musical as Kit De Luca at the Savoy Theatre.

On television, she appears in the CBeebies revival of Big Cook, Little Cook (2022–present).

Early life
Bowman was born and raised in Boston, Lincolnshire, England. She is dual-heritage and describes herself as Afro-European. Bowman attended Boston High School from eleven to eighteen. She then went on to train at the Guildford School of Acting for three years until she graduated in 2016. Bowman also performed at the 10th annual Stephen Sondheim Society Student Performer of the Year competition held at the Novello Theatre on 15 May 2016, she won the award and £1000 after performing “Me and My Town” from Anyone Can Whistle and “The Driving Lesson” from Heart of Winter by Tim Connor.

Career
Bowman performed at both Josh Groban on Stage in 2015 as a chorister and at Sam Bailey's 2016 concert Sam Bailey: In Concert as a soloist.

She is currently a client of Belfield & Ward Talent Agency.

In November 2016, Bowman was announced as part of the original cast of Everybody's Talking About Jamie playing at the Crucible Theatre, Sheffield during its original string of performances the following year. It was announced in late-June 2017 that Bowman would return in the same role for its West End transfer in late 2017 following its successful run in Sheffield.

Whilst performing the role of Fatimah in Everybody's Talking About Jamie at the Apollo Theatre, a professionally filmed version of the musical, featuring Bowman, was broadcast into more than 600 cinemas worldwide. It was initially administered by entertainment event cinema distributor More 2 Screen on 5 July 2018, while encore screenings took place on 29 January and 13 June 2019.

In June 2019, it was announced via Pearson Casting, that alongside Danielle Steers, Bowman would join the cast of Six on 15 October 2019.

From 2019 to 2021, Bowman played Anne Boleyn as part of the principal cast of the West End production of Six. Bowman returned to Six when it opened at the Lyric Theatre after having closed for the COVID-19 pandemic. From late September 2021, she moved to the Vaudeville Theatre where she would complete her Six run; her final performance took place on 14 November 2021.

Bowman performed a solo concert at Pizza Express, Holborn on 15 March 2020 and a socially distanced recorded concert at the Arts Theatre on 7 September 2020. She also appeared in two drive-in concerts, a collaborative concert at the Turbine Theatre within the Battersea Power Station complex, and a charity concert at the Actor's Church, Covent Garden.  In April 2021, Bowman portrayed Princess Badroulbadour in an online production of Disenchanted!, produced by stream.theatre.

In mid-February 2022, it was announced Bowman would star in a 50 episode revival series of the pre-school cookery show Big Cook, Little Cook as Little Cook Small on CBeebies, airing daily from 28 February 2022. In March 2022, it was announced exclusively via WhatsOnStage that Bowman would portray the leading role of Elle Woods in the revival of Legally Blonde at Regent's Park Open Air Theatre. In an interview with The Independent she recounts how the production is distinct from other iterations of the musical, citing subtle differences to the script and lyrics in order for the production to align itself with the present day. She also starred in a revival concert version of Kinky Boots at the Theatre Royal, Drury Lane in August 2022, portraying the role of Lauren. In late-September it was revealed Bowman would be attending the first-ever MusicalCon fan convention taking place at London's ExCel Centre on 22–23 October 2022. It was announced in October 2022 via the Olivier Awards social channels, that Bowman would host the annual UK Theatre Awards at the Guildhall, London that same month on 23 October 2022.

It was announced by Ambassador Theatre Group Productions in late-October 2022, that Bowman would portray the supporting role of Kit de Luca in the West End production of Pretty Woman: The Musical playing at the Savoy Theatre from mid-November 2022. 

Bowman hosted the 2023 WhatsOnStage Awards alongside Laurie Kynaston and her Legally Blonde co-star Billy Luke Nevers on 12 February 2023 at the Prince of Wales Theatre. That evening, she also won the first gender-neutral WhatsOnStage Award for Best Performer in a Musical for her performance as Elle Woods in Legally Blonde at Regent's Park Open Air Theatre. In their speech, she thanked her mother, best friend and cast of Legally Blonde.

Stage

Filmography

Television

Radio

Podcast

Awards and nominations

External links

References

Living people
1995 births
21st-century English actresses
21st-century English women singers
21st-century English singers
Actresses from Lincolnshire
Black British actresses
English musical theatre actresses
English stage actresses
Musicians from Lincolnshire
People from Boston, Lincolnshire